Gustavo Luza (born 11 October 1962) is a former tennis player from Argentina.

Luza turned professional in 1985. He was most known for playing doubles, and during his career he won 5 doubles titles, including the Barcelona Open with Christian Miniussi. He reached his highest doubles ATP-ranking on July 9, 1990, when he became the number 37 of the world.

In 2002, after retiring from professional tennis, Luza became the captain of the Argentina Davis Cup team from 2002 to 2004.

Career finals

Doubles (5 titles, 4 runner-ups)

External links
 
 
 

1962 births
Living people
Argentine male tennis players
Tennis players from Buenos Aires